CERN httpd (later also known as W3C httpd) is an early, now discontinued, web server (HTTP) daemon originally developed at CERN from 1990 onwards by Tim Berners-Lee, Ari Luotonen and Henrik Frystyk Nielsen. Implemented in C, it was the first web server software.

History 

CERN httpd was originally developed on a NeXT Computer running NeXTSTEP, and was later ported to other Unix-like operating systems, OpenVMS and systems with unix emulation layers, e.g. OS/2 with emx+gcc. It could also be configured as a web proxy server.
Version 0.1 was released in June 1991.
In August 1991, Berners-Lee announced in the Usenet newsgroup alt.hypertext the availability of the source code of the server daemon (named WWWDaemon) and other World Wide Web software from the CERN FTP site. 

The server was presented on the Hypertext 91 conference in San Antonio and was part of the CERN Program Library (CERNLIB).

Later versions of the server are based on the libwww library. The development of CERN httpd was later taken over by World Wide Web Consortium (W3C), with the last release being version 3.0A of 15 July 1996. From 1996 onwards, W3C focused on the development of the Java-based Jigsaw server.

The initial version was public domain software; the last one was under an MIT License.

See also 

 Comparison of web server software
 Traffic Server
 Web accelerator, which discusses host-based HTTP acceleration
 Proxy server, which discusses client-side proxies
 Reverse proxy, which discusses origin-side proxies

References

External links 
 The historic W3C page for httpd
 The historic web site in the W3C archive of November 1992
 CERN republished her first website.

Free web server software
Discontinued software
History of the Internet
Software using the MIT license
Public-domain software with source code
CERN software